The 1983 Mercedes Cup, was a men's tennis tournament played on outdoor clay courts and held at the Tennis Club Weissenhof in Stuttgart, West Germany that was part of the 1983 Grand Prix circuit. It was the sixth edition of the tournament and was held from 11 July until 17 July 1983. First-seeded José Higueras won the singles title.

Finals

Singles
 José Higueras defeated  Heinz Günthardt, 6–1, 6–1, 7–6
 It was Higueras' 3rd singles title of the year and the 14th of his career.

Doubles
 Mike Bauer /  Anand Amritraj defeated  Pavel Složil /  Tomáš Šmíd, 4–6, 6–3, 6–2

References

External links
 Official website 
 ATP tournament profile

Stuttgart Open
Stuttgart Open
1983 in German tennis